Pieter Sjoerds Gerbrandy (born Pieter Gerbrandij; 13 April 1885 – 7 September 1961) was a Dutch politician and jurist who served as Prime Minister of the Netherlands from 3 September 1940 until 25 June 1945. He oversaw the government-in-exile based in London under Queen Wilhelmina during the German occupation of the Netherlands. He was a member of the now-defunct Anti-Revolutionary Party (ARP), later merged into the Christian Democratic Appeal (CDA).

Early life
Pieter Sjoerds Gerbrandy was born on 13 April 1885 in the village of Goënga, near Sneek, in the province of Friesland, in the Netherlands. He was an ethnic Frisian, and his name is styled in the traditional Frisian way: first name ("Pieter"), patronymic ("Sjoerds", meaning "son of Sjoerd"), family name (Gerbrandy). Incidentally, the name Gerbrandy is also a patronymic since his great-great-grandfather Jouke Gerbrens (1769–1840) took "Gerbrandy" as a family name on 30 December 1811.

Pieter applied to Vrije Universiteit Amsterdam in June 1904 and majored in law. He would obtain a doctorate in law in January 1911 and proceeded to work as a lawyer and prosecutor from 1911 to 1920.

Early polical career
Gerbrandy was a member of the Municipal Council of Sneek from April 1916 to January 1930, the Provincial-Council of Friesland from July 1919 to August 1920 and the Provincial-Executive of Friesland from August 1920 to January 1930.

From 1920 to 1930, he was a member of the Provincial Council of Friesland for the Anti-Revolutionary Party (ARP). He also served as Minister of Justice in 1939 against his party's wishes.

Second World War
The German victory at the Battle of the Netherlands in 1940 made the Dutch royal family and many leading politicians flee to London and form a government-in-exile. Combined with Dirk Jan de Geer's resignation the same year, that resulted in Queen Wilhelmia appoint Gerbrandy as prime minister of the Dutch government-in-exile. He also served as Minister of Justice and Minister of Colonial Affairs.

Postwar
After the liberation of the southern Netherlands in 1945, Gerbrandy formed a new cabinet, but he resigned after the total liberation of the country. He opposed the government's Indonesian policy and from 1946 to 1950 chaired the National Committee for the Maintenance of the Kingdom's Unity, which opposed Indonesian independence and advocated for the Republic of the South Moluccas.

In 1950, Gerbrandy published Indonesia, which offered an explanation of the history of the relationship between the Netherlands and the Dutch East Indies (now Indonesia) from the 1600s to 1948, which included "The Indies under Dutch rule", "The Rule of Law", "The Japanese Occupation", and "Chaos", with each section outlining Gerbrandy's observations.

In 1948, Gerbrandy returned as a member of the Dutch Parliament, but his hot temper alienated members of his party. In 1956, he was made member of a commission that investigated the affair surrounding Greet Hofmans. Three years later, Gerbrandy resigned as a Member of Parliament.

Personal life
On 18 May 1911, Gerbrandy married Hendrina Elisabeth Sikkel (26 February 1886 – 4 May 1980). Pieter Sjoerds Gerbrandy died on 7 September 1961 in The Hague, at the age of 76.

Decorations

References

External links

Official
  Mr.Dr. P.S. (Pieter) Gerbrandy Parlement & Politiek

 

 

 
 

 
 

 

1885 births
1961 deaths
Anti-Revolutionary Party politicians
Dutch anti-communists
Dutch expatriates in England
20th-century Dutch judges
Dutch legal scholars
Dutch lobbyists
Dutch nonprofit directors
Dutch people of World War II
Dutch political activists
Dutch political commentators
Dutch political writers
Dutch prosecutors
Foreign policy writers
Honorary Knights Grand Cross of the Order of the British Empire
Alumni_of_the_University_of_Edinburgh
Intellectual property law scholars
Knights Grand Cross of the Order of Orange-Nassau
Members of the Provincial Council of Friesland
Members of the Provincial-Executive of Friesland
Members of the House of Representatives (Netherlands)
Ministers of Colonial Affairs of the Netherlands
Ministers of Justice of the Netherlands
Ministers of State (Netherlands)
Municipal councillors in Friesland
People from Sneek
Politicians from The Hague
Prime Ministers of the Netherlands
Recipients of the Order of the Netherlands Lion
Reformed Churches Christians from the Netherlands
Royal Netherlands Army officers
Scholars of property law
Scholars of competition law
Vrije Universiteit Amsterdam alumni
Academic staff of Vrije Universiteit Amsterdam
World War II political leaders
20th-century Dutch civil servants
20th-century Dutch educators
20th-century Dutch male writers
20th-century Dutch military personnel
20th-century Dutch politicians